The Japan women's national tennis team represents Japan in Fed Cup tennis competition and are governed by the Japan Tennis Association. They were most recently promoted to the 2019 Fed Cup World Group II after defeating Great Britain in the 2018 World Group II Play-offs.

History
Japan competed in its first Fed Cup in 1964. They achieved their best result by reaching the semifinals in 1996.

Current team (2019 Fed Cup, World Group II Playoffs - 20–21 April - vs Netherlands)
WTA rankings as of 15 April 2019
Misaki Doi (WTA singles ranking No. 104/doubles ranking No. 123)
Nao Hibino (WTA singles ranking No. 112/doubles ranking No. 78)
Kurumi Nara (WTA singles ranking No. 169/doubles ranking No. 491)
Eri Hozumi (WTA singles ranking No. 327/doubles ranking No. 31)
Shuko Aoyama (WTA singles ranking No. 562/doubles ranking No. 44)

Recent call-ups
The following players have been called up in the last three years. (Most recent call-up in brackets)
Naomi Osaka (2018 Fed Cup World Group II Play-offs)
Miyu Kato (2019 Fed Cup World Group II, 1st Round)
Makoto Ninomiya (2019 Fed Cup World Group II, 1st Round)

Results

See also
Japan Davis Cup team

References

External links

Billie Jean King Cup teams
Fed Cup
Fed Cup